WAGI-LP (97.5 FM, "Praise FM") is a Christian radio station licensed to serve Kankakee, Illinois. The station is owned by the First Assembly of God Church, and is a part-time affiliate of American Family Radio. WAGI-LP began broadcasting in 2015.

References

External links
 Official Website
 

AGI-LP
Radio stations established in 2015
2015 establishments in Illinois
AGI-LP
Kankakee County, Illinois
American Family Radio stations